The 120 mm M984 extended-range DPICM mortar round was developed by the US Army Ordnance. It is a 120mm caliber mortar cluster munition that can carry a variety of payloads including either 54 M80 dual-purpose submunitions or six mines. It can be optionally used with a range extending rocket in a tractor configuration which increases its range from 7.2 to around 12 kilometers.

As the United States has not ratified the Convention on Cluster Munitions, it is still in production.

Specifications
 Length: 940mm
 Weight: 14.9 kg

References

120mm mortars
Mortar munitions
Military equipment introduced in the 2000s